The 2016–17 Maine Black Bears men's basketball team  represented the University of Maine during the 2016–17 NCAA Division I men's basketball season. The Black Bears, led by third-year head coach Bob Walsh, played their home games at Cross Insurance Center as members of the America East Conference. They finished the season 7–25 (3–13 in America East) to finish in a tie for eighth place. They lost in the quarter-finals of the America East tournament to Vermont.

Previous season
The Black Bears finished the 2015–16 season with an 8–22 overall record and 4–12 in conference. They finished in a tie for seventh place in America East play. They lost in the quarterfinals of the America East tournament to Vermont.

Preseason 
Maine was picked to finish last in the preseason America East poll.

Departures

Incoming Transfers

2016 incoming recruits

Roster

Schedule and results

|-
!colspan=9 style=| Exhibition

|-
!colspan=9 style=| Non-conference regular season

|-
!colspan=9 style=| America East regular season

|-
!colspan=9 style=| America East tournament

References

Maine
Maine Black Bears men's basketball seasons
Maine Black Bears men's b
Maine Black Bears men's b